Homoeosoma electellum, the American sunflower moth, is a species of moth of the  family Pyralidae. It is native to North America but also found in South America.

The wingspan is 18–20 mm. Adults have off-white wings with a number of dark scale spots as well as dark scales on the distal one third of the wing.

The larvae are a pest of canola and sunflowers. Other recorded food plants include cotton and oranges.

References

Phycitini
Moths described in 1887